Pushkaryov or Pushkarev (from пушкарь meaning artilleryman) is a Russian masculine surname, its feminine counterpart is Pushkaryova or Pushkareva. It may refer to:

Aleksei Pushkarev (born 1986), Russian bobsledder
Andrei Pushkarev (born 1985), Russian football player 
Konstantin Pushkaryov (born 1985), Kazakhstani ice hockey winger
Marina Pushkareva (born 1989), Russian football player
Vladimir Pushkarev (1921–1994), Russian weightlifter

See also
Pushkar (disambiguation)

Russian-language surnames